Jeffrey or Geoffrey Adams may refer to:

Jeff Adams (born 1970), Canadian Paralympian
Jeff Adams (American football) (born 1989), American football player
Jeffrey Adams (mathematician) (born 1955), mathematician at the University of Maryland
Geoffrey Adams (born 1957), British diplomat
Geoffrey Adams (cricketer) (1909–1998), English cricketer
Geoff Adams (journalist), New Zealand newspaper editor for Otago Daily Times
Jeff Adams, character in The Amazing Mrs. Holliday
Jeff Adams, candidate in the United States House of Representatives elections in Illinois, 2010